Mohamed Maged Mohamed Ali Khalil Eldeeb is the former president of Ain Shams University.

References

Living people
Academic staff of Ain Shams University
Year of birth missing (living people)
Place of birth missing (living people)